Verchères is an off-island suburb of Montreal, in Montérégie, Quebec, located on the south bank of the Saint Lawrence River. The population as of the Canada 2011 Census was 5,692.

History 
In the 17th century, the settlement at Verchères was the scene of an Iroquois raid that was apparently thwarted by the ingenuity of a 14-year-old girl named Madeleine (now known as Madeleine de Verchères).  A cast-iron statue of Madeleine de Verchères stands today by the former location of the settlement stronghold on the shore of the Saint-Lawrence river.

In French, the word Verchères can be used as an adjective to describe a specific type of rowboat invented in Verchères at the end of the 19th century, i.e. chaloupe verchères.  A specimen of the rowboat is on permanent outdoor display during the summer and fall at the Parc Jean-Marie Moreau across from the town office.

The motto of Verchères is In Tenebris Lumen Rectis Corde. The streets of Verchères are mostly named after the patronyms of residing families but also after local people who rose to celebrity in Canadian history.

Demographics

Population

Language

Notable natives and residents 
Joseph Coulon de Jumonville whose death while a prisoner of George Washington ignited the French and Indian War theater of the Seven Years' War
Louis Coulon de Villiers who is the only officer to whom Washington ever surrendered.
François Coulon de Villiers another of the Coulon brothers who would later be Alcalde of New Orleans, Louisiana (New Spain)
Bernard Landry former Premier of Quebec .
Lynda Lemay, songwriter and singer.
Calixa Lavallée, composer of O Canada.
Pierre Bouchard, Montreal Canadiens retired former professional hockey player.
Alexandre Beaudoin, fingerprint scientist
Joseph Bailly, fur trader and first permanent Euro-American settler in northwest Indiana. His homestead is a part of Indiana Dunes National Park.

Panorama

See also
List of municipalities in Quebec

References

External links

Official site of Verchères

Municipalities in Quebec
Incorporated places in Marguerite-D'Youville Regional County Municipality
Quebec populated places on the Saint Lawrence River
Greater Montreal
1971 establishments in Quebec